Saint-Servais is a commune in the Côtes-d'Armor department of Brittany in northwestern France.

Burtulet
Since 1869, the hamlet of Burthulet or Burtulet is part of the Saint-Servais commune. Central in Burthulet is a 16th-c chapel, which once belonged to the Knights Hospitaller chapter of La Feuillée.

Population

See also
Communes of the Côtes-d'Armor department

References

External links

Communes of Côtes-d'Armor